Louis Mayer may refer to:
 Louis B. Mayer (1884–1957), American film producer
 Louis Mayer (painter) (1791–1843), German landscape painter
 Louis Mayer (1868-1941), Monegasque lawyer